The Critics' Choice Movie Award for Best Director is one of the awards given to film directors working in the film industry by the Critics Choice Association at the annual Critics' Choice Movie Awards. It was first given out to Mel Gibson for Braveheart in 1996 as a juried award. Until 2001, only the winner was presented; since then, a set of nominees is announced every year. 

Only four directors have received the award more than once with two wins each: Alfonso Cuarón, Sam Mendes, Martin Scorsese, and Steven Spielberg. The latter also holds the record of most nominations in the category with eight. Kathryn Bigelow, Jane Campion, and Chloé Zhao are the only female winners of the award.

Winners and nominees

1990s

2000s

2010s

2020s

Multiple nominees

2 nominations
 Kathryn Bigelow
 Danny Boyle
 Tim Burton
 Ethan Coen
 Joel Coen
 Alfonso Cuarón
 Guillermo del Toro
 Greta Gerwig
 Paul Greengrass
 Tom Hooper
 Alejandro González Iñárritu
 Peter Jackson
 Ang Lee
 Spike Lee
 Baz Luhrmann
 Martin McDonagh
 Alexander Payne
 David O. Russell
 Ridley Scott
 Quentin Tarantino
 Denis Villeneuve

3 nominations
 James Cameron
 Damien Chazelle
 Ron Howard
 Christopher Nolan

4 nominations
 Clint Eastwood
 David Fincher

6 nominations
 Martin Scorsese

9 nominations
 Steven Spielberg

Multiple winners
2 wins
 Alfonso Cuarón
 Sam Mendes
 Martin Scorsese
 Steven Spielberg

See also
 BAFTA Award for Best Direction
 Academy Award for Best Director
 Golden Globe Award for Best Director
 Independent Spirit Award for Best Director
 Directors Guild of America Award for Outstanding Directing – Feature Film

References

External links
 Official website

D
Awards established in 1996
Awards for best director